Horst Effertz (born 4 August 1938) is a retired German rower who won a gold medal in the coxed fours at the 1960 Summer Olympics. Four years later he competed in the coxless fours and finished in sixth place. Effertz won two European titles in 1959 and 1964 and finished second in 1958.

References

1938 births
Living people
Olympic rowers of the United Team of Germany
Rowers at the 1960 Summer Olympics
Rowers at the 1964 Summer Olympics
Olympic gold medalists for the United Team of Germany
Sportspeople from Düsseldorf
Olympic medalists in rowing
West German male rowers
Medalists at the 1960 Summer Olympics
European Rowing Championships medalists